Eicochrysops dudgeoni, the Dudgeon's Cupid, is a butterfly in the family Lycaenidae. It is found in Guinea (Nimba Range), Sierra Leone, Ghana, northern Nigeria, northern Cameroon. The habitat consists of Guinea savanna.

Males mud-puddle and both sexes are attracted to flowers.

References

Butterflies described in 1929
Eicochrysops